Pygoleptura nigrella is a species of flower longhorn in the beetle family Cerambycidae. It is found in North America.

Subspecies
These two subspecies belong to the species Pygoleptura nigrella:
 Pygoleptura nigrella nigrella (Say, 1826)
 Pygoleptura nigrella oregonensis Linsley & Chemsak, 1976

References

Further reading

 
 

Lepturinae
Articles created by Qbugbot
Beetles described in 1826